Bandar Puteri Puchong is an affluent residential and commercial township in Puchong, Selangor, Malaysia. It was developed by the IOI Group, same as Bandar Puchong Jaya and Bandar Kinrara served as main residential hub of Puchong town. 

Within the township is a bustling commercial centre filled with a variety of businesses and services, including many major banks, a variety of eateries, a wet market - Puteri Mart in Bandar Puteri 5, and a hypermarket - Hero Market, in the building where Giant used to occupy located in Bandar Puteri 1. Bank of China (M) Bhd opened its 6th branch in Malaysia at Tower 2, PFCC, Puteri Puchong in 2012.

External links
BandarPuteriPuchong.comBandar Puteri Puchong - Garden City, Smart Lifestyle - 47100, Puchong, Selangor Darul Ehsan

Commerce 
Bandar Puteri Puchong is the center for numerous banking facilities, and they are all in walking distance from one another. The banks in this location are:
 Alliance Bank
 Citibank
 Maybank
 CIMB
 Standard Chartered
 RHB
 Bank of China
 OCBC
 Public Bank
 Hong Leong Bank
 Affin Bank
 Bank Simpanan Nasional

References

Townships in Selangor